Ascherson is a surname. Notable people with the surname include:

 Neal Ascherson (born 1932), Scottish journalist
 Pamela Ascherson (1923–2010), British sculptor, painter, and illustrator
 Paul Friedrich August Ascherson (1834–1913), German botanist

See also
 Renée Asherson (born Dorothy Renée Ascherson, 1915–2014), English actress